The 2016 Sun Belt Conference softball tournament was held at the Bobcat Softball Complex on the campus of the Texas State University in San Marcos, Texas, from May 6 through May 9, 2015. The tournament winner earned the Sun Belt Conference's automatic bid to the 2016 NCAA Division I softball tournament. Day one of the tournament acted as a single elimination tournament, while Day 2 begins a double elimination format among the remaining 4 teams. The championship game was winner takes all. Days 1 & 2 of the tournament were streamed via sunbeltsports.org. Days 3 and 4 of the tournament (semifinals & championship) were televised on ESPN3.

Tournament

Day one bracket 1

Day one bracket 2

Days two–four 

 All times listed are Central Daylight Time.

Broadcasters 
 Day 1: Dan McDonald (sunbeltsports.org)

Tournament
Sun Belt Conference softball tournament